Zhivar may refer to:
 Zhivar, Ilam (ژيور - Zhīvar)
 Zhivar, Kurdistan (ژيوار - Zhīvār)